Massimiliano "Max" Sirena (born 4 December 1971 in Rimini) is an Italian sailor who has competed in multiple America's Cups.

Biography
Sirena sailed with Luna Rossa Challenge in their 2000, 2003 and 2007 Louis Vuitton Cup campaigns as a mid-bowman. Sirena was the wing mast manager for Oracle Racing when they won the 2010 America's Cup.

Sirena skippered Luna Rossa Challenge in the 2013 Louis Vuitton Cup. The team won the 2011 Extreme Sailing Series. After Luna Rossa withdrew from the 2017 America's Cup, Sirena joined Team New Zealand in a management role.

See also
 Italy at the America's Cup

References

External links
 Max Sirena at Luna Rossa Challenge

Living people
Italian male sailors (sport)
2000 America's Cup sailors
2003 America's Cup sailors
2007 America's Cup sailors
2013 America's Cup sailors
Sportspeople from Rimini
Luna Rossa Challenge sailors
Oracle Racing sailors
Team New Zealand sailors
Extreme Sailing Series sailors
1971 births
2021 America's Cup sailors